Rapperswil-Jona/Hombrechtikon–Feldbach or commonly Seegubel is one of the 111 serial sites of the UNESCO World Heritage Site Prehistoric pile dwellings around the Alps, of which are 56 located in Switzerland.

Geography 
Seegubel is located on Zürichsee lakeshore in Feldbach and partially in Kempraten, a locality of the municipality of Rapperswil-Jona in the Canton of St. Gallen in Switzerland. Situated nearby the Seedamm, an isthmus between the Zürichsee and the Obersee lake area, it was in close vicinity to the prehistoric lake crossings, neighbored by three other Prehistoric pile dwelling settlements: Freienbach–Hurden Rosshorn, Freienbach–Hurden Seefeld and Rapperswil-Jona–Technikum. The settlement comprises , and the buffer zone including the lake area comprises  in all.

Description 
Distinctive house plans and a cultural layer dating from the middle phase of the Corded Ware period, is of particular importance in that multi-phase settlement, commonly named Seegubel. The evidence of a settlement from the transitional phase between the Early and Middle Bronze Ages, is another interesting aspect of the site, yielded a date of 1490 BC, which is very late within the Early Bronze Age pile-dwelling period. The dates refer to the same period as the transport routes across the lake from Rosshorn in Hurden and the slightly post-date neighbouring island settlement in Rapperswil.

Finds 
Highly remarkable are the remains of the stone axe production from the 4th to 3rd millennium BC, including tees, pieces with saw wafers, semi-finished products and finished blades, which show the manufacturing processes. The most common materials include green rocks, serpentinites and flint also for knives and arrowheads.

Protection 
As well as being part of the 56 Swiss sites of the UNESCO World Heritage Site Prehistoric pile dwellings around the Alps, the settlement is also listed in the Swiss inventory of cultural property of national and regional significance as a Class A object of national importance. Hence, the area of each settlement is provided as a historical site under federal protection, within the meaning of the Swiss Federal Act on the nature and cultural heritage (German: Bundesgesetz über den Natur- und Heimatschutz NHG) of 1 July 1966. Unauthorised researching and purposeful gathering of findings represent a criminal offense according to Art. 24.

See also 
 Prehistoric pile dwellings around Zürichsee

Literature 
 Peter J. Suter, Helmut Schlichtherle et al.: Pfahlbauten – Palafittes – Palafitte. Palafittes, Biel 2009. .
 Beat Eberschweiler: Ur- und frühgeschichtliche Verkehrswege über den Zürichsee: Erste Ergebnisse aus den Taucharchäologischen Untersuchungen beim Seedamm. In: Mitteilungen des Historischen Vereins des Kantons Schwyz, Volume 96, Schwyz 2004.

References

External links 

 

Prehistoric pile dwellings in Switzerland
Rapperswil-Jona
Hombrechtikon
Lake Zurich
Cultural property of national significance in the canton of St. Gallen
Cultural property of national significance in the canton of Zürich
Archaeological sites in Switzerland